Lalak Lake is a pond in Mukim Labi, Belait District, Brunei. The Brunei Malay term "Luagan", refers to a natural pond or non-flowing body of water.

Luagan Lalak Recreation Park 
In 1993, the planning of the formerly named Luagan Lalak Forestry Recreation Park began, and it only began renovation in commemoration of the 2012 World Forestry Day. From 2001 until May 2022, the park has seen a total of 81,000 visitors. 

The entire  recreation park sits in a freshwater swamp forest. A  wooden bridge stretching out to three different gazebos above the lake is commonly used by people. Green hills can be seen surrounding the park.

See also 

 Protected areas of Brunei

References 

Lakes of Brunei
Belait District
Protected areas of Brunei